Nathipora is a village in the Bomai block in Sopore tehsil, within the Baramulla District of Jammu and Kashmir, India.

The village has total population of 1827 as per 2011 census. Nathipora village has higher literacy rate compared to Jammu and Kashmir. In 2011, literacy rate of Nathi Pora village was 68.12% compared to 67.16% of Jammu and Kashmir. In Nathi Pora Male literacy stands at 81.65% while female literacy rate was 55.33%.

Nathipora is located on Sopore-Kupwara highway of Jammu and Kashmir. It is a famous village for apple cultivation locally.

References

Villages in Anantnag district